Gerald Sanford Levin (January 1, 1906 – June 5, 1971) was a United States district judge of the United States District Court for the Northern District of California.

Education and career

Born in Danville, Illinois, Levin received an Artium Baccalaureus degree from the University of California, Berkeley in 1927 and a Bachelor of Laws from the UC Berkeley School of Law in 1930. He entered private practice in California in 1924, and was a state court judge in California from 1955 to 1966.

Federal judicial service

On June 13, 1969, Levin was nominated by President Richard Nixon to a new seat on the United States District Court for the Northern District of California created by 80 Stat. 75. He was confirmed by the United States Senate on July 11, 1969, and received his commission on July 14, 1969. Levin's service lasted less than two years, ending with his death on June 5, 1971, at the age of 65.

See also
List of Jewish American jurists

References

Sources
 

1906 births
1971 deaths
People from Danville, Illinois
California state court judges
Judges of the United States District Court for the Northern District of California
United States district court judges appointed by Richard Nixon
20th-century American judges
20th-century American lawyers
UC Berkeley School of Law alumni
Golden Gate University faculty